Nushagak Bay  is a large estuary covering over 100 km2 in southwest part of the U.S. state of Alaska. It opens to Bristol Bay, a large body of water in the eastern Bering Sea north of the Alaska Peninsula.

It is home to the area's largest city, Dillingham, and the bay hosts one of the world's last great sustainable sockeye salmon fisheries.

Bristol Bay residents have historically valued the estuary resources for both subsistence gains and commercial profits.   However, given the estuary's importance, there have been few comprehensive scientific studies conducted in the bay.  Species diversity as measured through richness and total biomass is generally low with 16 macro invertebrate species encountered in a 2007 field study, including teleost fishes, isopods, amphipods, and crangon shrimps. During the summer 2007, Nushagak Bay was found to have a Shannon Diversity (H’) value of 1.54, ranking it below  similar subarctic estuaries such as Ungava Bay, near Labrador (60°34’N, 67°35’W) and Lower Herring Bay in Price William Sound (60°30’N, 147°13’W) where the Shannon Diversity values are H’=2.11 and H’=2.5, respectively.  This lower diversity of Nushagak Bay is most likely due to its low salinity, high turbidity, and silty sediments.

Nushagak Bay is downstream of the proposed Pebble Mine, whose tailings storage lake would sit at the headwaters of the Koktuli River, one of the Nushagak River's tributaries.  Villages on the Nushagak are among the major opponents of the proposal.

The bay runs primarily north–south from the mouth of the Nushagak River to Bristol Bay some 30 miles (48 km) southward. The bay is also fed by several additional rivers, including the Wood, Igushik, and Snake rivers.

References

External links
Photos from the Region
Pebble Mine environmental information

Bays of Alaska
Bodies of water of Dillingham Census Area, Alaska